Eugen Karl Dühring (12 January 1833, Berlin21 September 1921, Nowawes in modern-day Potsdam-Babelsberg) was a German philosopher, positivist, economist, and socialist who was a strong critic of Marxism.

Life and works 
Dühring was born in Berlin, Prussia. After a legal education he practised at Berlin as a lawyer until 1859. A weakness of the eyes, ending in total blindness, occasioned his taking up the studies with which his name is now connected. In 1864, he became docent of the University of Berlin, but, in consequence of a quarrel with the professoriate, was deprived of his licence to teach in 1874.

He also published  (1881, The Jewish Question as a Racial, Moral, and Cultural Question).

Dühring's philosophy claims to be emphatically the philosophy of reality. He is passionate in his denunciation of everything which, like mysticism, tries to veil reality. He is, in the words of historian Carlton J. H. Hayes "almost Lucretian in his anger against religion" which would withdraw the secret of the universe from our direct gaze. His substitute for religion is a doctrine in many points akin to Auguste Comte and Ludwig Andreas Feuerbach, the former of whom he resembles in his sentimentalism.

Dühring's economic views are said to derive largely from those of Friedrich List. On other matters, particularly their attitudes toward Jews, the two men held very different opinions.

Thought 
He was "deeply" influenced by Schopenhauer throughout his career. Dühring's opinions changed considerably after his first appearance as a writer. His earlier work,  (Natural Dialectics), is entirely in the spirit of critical philosophy. This adequacy of thought to things is because the universe contains but one reality, i.e. matter. It is to matter that we must look for the explanation both of conscious and of physical states. But matter is not, in his system, to be understood with the common meaning, but with a deeper sense as the substratum of all conscious and physical existence; and thus the laws of being are identified with the laws of thought. In this idealistic system Dühring finds room for teleology. The end of Nature, he holds, is the production of a race of conscious beings. From his belief in teleology he is not deterred by the enigma of pain. As a determined optimist, he asserts that pain exists to throw pleasure into conscious relief.

In ethics, Dühring follows Auguste Comte in making sympathy the foundation of morality. In political philosophy, he teaches an ethical communism and attacks Herbert Spencer's principle of Social Darwinism. In economics, he is best known by his vindication of the American writer H. C. Carey, who attracts him both by his theory of value, which suggests an ultimate harmony of the interests of capitalists and labourers; and also by his doctrine of national political economy, which advocates protection on the ground that the morals and culture of a people are promoted by having its whole system of industry complete within its own borders. His patriotism is fervent, but narrow and exclusive. He idolized Frederick the Great, and denounced Jews, Greeks, and the cosmopolitan Goethe. His writing has been characterized as clear and incisive, "though disfigured by arrogance and ill-temper, failings which may be extenuated on the ground of his physical affliction."

Throughout his life, Dühring was a vehement antisemite and was one of the first proponents of racial antisemitism in Germany. In 1881 Dühring's pamphlet Die Judenfrage als Racen-, Sitten- und Culturfrage (The Jewish Question as a question of race, morals and culture) was published. It was a pseudo-scientific attempt to give antisemitism as a political movement a biological, historical, and philosophical foundation. He described the “Jewish question” similarly to Wilhelm Marr, as an expression of an irresolvable racial antagonism, and openly advocated for the "murder and extermination" of Jews as a solution to the Jewish question.

Legacy 
He is chiefly remembered among English-speakers because of Engels' criticism of his views in : Herr Eugen Dühring's Revolution in Science. Engels wrote his  in opposition to Dühring's ideas, which had found some disciples among the German Social Democrats. He is also the most prominent representative of the socialism of that era attacked by Nietzsche in his later works. Most of Dühring's work remains unavailable in English, aside from his work on the Jewish question. Dühring's writing on the Jewish question influenced later antisemites and racist thinkers such as Theodor Fritsch, Houston Stewart Chamberlain and Georg von Schönerer.  Through this legacy, Dühring's antisemitic views later found their way into the racial doctrines of Nazism. 

Friedrich Nietzsche heavily criticized Dühring's opinions on morality in his work On the Genealogy of Morality:

I again remind readers who have ears to hear of that apostle of revenge from Berlin, Eugen Dühring, who makes the most indecent and disgusting use of moral clap-trap of anyone in Germany today: Dühring, today’s biggest loudmouth of morality, even amongst his kind, the anti-Semites.

"Heroic materialism" characterized Dühring's philosophy. He attacked capitalism, Marxism, and organized Christianity and Judaism.  Many scholars believe that Dühring's invention of a modern-sounding antisemitism helped persuade Theodor Herzl that Zionism was the only answer:

See also 
 Friedrich List

Notes

References 
 
 
 
 MIA Glossary of People, under the GFDL
 Encyclopedia of Marxism (Creative Commons)

1833 births
1921 deaths
Writers from Berlin
People from the Province of Brandenburg
19th-century German philosophers
19th-century German people
German economists
Academic staff of the Humboldt University of Berlin
19th-century German writers
19th-century German male writers
German male non-fiction writers
German socialists
Critics of Marxism
Antisemitism in Germany
Left-wing antisemitism
Racial antisemitism